Roland Wagner (born 22 December 1955, in Strasbourg) is a French former professional football player.

External links
Profile
Profile

1955 births
Living people
French people of German descent
French footballers
France international footballers
RC Strasbourg Alsace players
FC Mulhouse players
Ligue 1 players
Footballers from Strasbourg
FC Montceau Bourgogne players
Association football forwards